Zombie Nation may refer to:

 Zombie Nation (musician), a German techno artist best known for the song "Kernkraft 400"
 Zombie Nation (video game), a 1990 NES video game
 Zombie Nation (film), a 2004 independent film
 Z Nation, a 2014 television series on Syfy